State Trunk Highway 15 (STH-15, commonly known as Highway 15 or WIS 15) is a state highway in Outagamie County in the US state of Wisconsin that runs east–west and provides a shortcut to Appleton from U.S. Highway 45 (US 45) for travelers inbound from points north and west. Most of WIS 15 was once part of US 45, which was redirected south of New London to bypass Appleton and provide direct access to Oshkosh and points south.

Route description

WIS 15 begins at the junction of US 45 and County Trunk Highway T (CTH-T) in the Town of Hortonia (just southeast of New London) as a two-lane road and heads southeast to Hortonville. The route then continues southeast into Greenville where it becomes a multilane expressway just northwest of the unincorporated community. The highway intersects WIS 76 in Greenville then continues southeast for  before turning east at the junction with CTH-CB. WIS 15 then junctions with US 41 where it ends and Northland Avenue and CTH-OO begins in the Town of Grand Chute, just northwest of Appleton. The route between US 45 and Industrial Park Avenue west of Hortonville and from Greendale Road east of Hortonville to Julius Drive west of Greenville now has centerline rumble strips. WIS 15 provides access to Neuroscience Group Field at Fox Cities Stadium.

History

This is the third iteration of the route number. The first iteration followed present day US 41 from the Illinois border to Marinette via Milwaukee, Fond du Lac, Appleton and Green Bay. The second is the more well-known alignment following the present day Interstate 43 (I-43) from the Hale Interchange in Milwaukee to I-90 in Beloit as the Rock Freeway. From the Hale Interchange, this iteration followed I-894 northward then turned east onto National Avenue and ending in downtown Milwaukee.

Previously, the current WIS 15 route was US 45—which turned south at its intersection with WIS 76. The later highway continued straight on to intersect with Wisconsin Avenue (then US 10) at the north entrance road to the Fox River Mall in Appleton. The road was realigned as part of a large project that realigned US 10 and US 45. Essentially, the road south of Greenville became an extension of WIS 76 and WIS 15 is now the sole route number on the current stretch.

Future

The highway is currently being studied for expansion by the Wisconsin Department of Transportation (WisDOT). This includes possible bypass options of Hortonville and capacity expansion. The limits of the study are from US 45 in New London to WIS 76 in Greenville (where the current multilane expressway begins)

Major intersections

See also

References

External links

015
Transportation in Outagamie County, Wisconsin
U.S. Route 45